Jorge Ignacio Gatgens Quirós (born 23 July 1988) is a Costa Rican football right midfielder.

Club career
Gatgens started his career at Pérez Zeledón for whom he made his debut on 23 July 2007 against Puntarenas and joined Alajuelense in summer 2011. He returned to Pérez Zeledón in summer 2013.

International career
In June 2007 he was omitted from the definitive Costa Rica U20 for the 2007 FIFA U-20 World Cup held in Canada.

Gatgens made his debut in Costa Rica for an October 1996 friendly match against Venezuela, that as of May 2014 was his sole international match. He was included in the Costa Rica national football team for the 2011 Copa América, but did not play at all in the tournament.

References

External links
 
 Player profile – Alajuelense
 

1988 births
Living people
Association football defenders
Costa Rican footballers
Costa Rica international footballers
2011 Copa América players
Municipal Pérez Zeledón footballers
L.D. Alajuelense footballers
A.D. San Carlos footballers
C.F. Universidad de Costa Rica footballers
Municipal Liberia footballers
C.D. Guastatoya players
C.D. Malacateco players
Liga FPD players
Liga Nacional de Fútbol de Guatemala players